Peter Li Preti (born 1951 or 1952) was a city councillor in Toronto, Ontario, Canada, who represented one of the two York West wards from 1985 to 2006.

Background
Li Preti received a B.A. and M.A. at the University of Toronto and went on to complete a Masters of Education in School Psychology and Clinical Counselling. He later achieved a Doctorate in Clinical Psychology, and he practised as a psychometrist. Li Preti is founder and president of the Family and Individual Psychoneurological Assessment Centre.

North York city councillor
Li Preti was appointed to fill a vacancy on North York City Council in 1985 when former alderman Claudio Polsinelli ran for a seat in the provincial legislature. Representing the troubled Jane and Finch, he campaigned for development in the area, including extending the Spadina subway.  He also argued that the media was biased against the region, and attempted to set up a fund that would sue for libel any media outlet that spoke negatively of the area.

Federal politics
Prior to the 1993 federal election, Li Preti had sought the Liberal Party nomination in the York Centre riding.  However, Liberal leader Jean Chrétien directly appointed Art Eggleton to run in the seat.  Besides Li Preti and his supporters, the appointment was criticized by several high profile Toronto Liberals including Joe Volpe, Dennis Mills, and John Nunziata.  Allegations of racism against Italian-Canadians were also levelled. After battling Chrétien in the media and in the courts, Li Preti eventually chose to run as an independent, branding himself an "independent Liberal" using the Liberal colour red, and promising voters he would ask to join the Liberal caucus in House of Commons if elected. Li Preti came under some criticism for potentially misleading some voters as to his affiliation with the party. Unlike the pro-choice Eggleton, he took an anti-abortion position. He emphasized his support for industrial development in many of the CFB Downsview lands in the riding that were being decommissioned. Li Preti came in a distant second polling 3,918 votes to Eggleton's 27, 150.

Toronto city councillor
In 1997 when North York was merged with Toronto and the other parts of Metro to form the new "megacity", he was elected to the new Toronto City Council in the 1997 He was also elected in 2000 and 2003 elections.

In the 2006 municipal election he sought re-election against former North York colleague Anthony Perruzza. Several incidents occurred during advanced polling on the weekend of November 4–5, 2006, leading to Li Preti and Perruzza accusing each other of dirty campaigning and the breaking of numerous elections. Perruzza beat him by 579 votes. The contest was repeated in the 2010 municipal election with Peruzza prevailing by 352 votes.

Following his loss, Li Preti was found to have cheated in his 2010 election campaign. A forensic audit ordered by the City of Toronto’s Compliance Audit Committee determined that Li Preti had, contrary to Ontario’s Municipal Elections Act, accepted 46 corporate contributions and overspent his campaign spending limit by $3,065 or 13%.

Election results

Unofficial results as of October 26, 2010 03:55 am

|-
| align="left" | Anthony Perruzza
| align="right" | 4,738
| align="right" | 45.70
|-
| align="left" | (x)Peter Li Preti
| align="right" | 4,159
| align="right" | 40.11
|-
| align="left" | Hau Dang Tan
| align="right" | 734
| align="right" | 7.08
|-
| align="left" | Garry Green
| align="right" | 371
| align="right" | 3.58
|-
| align="left" | Ramnarine Tiwari
| align="right" | 193
| align="right" | 1.86
|-
| align="left" | Abdulhaq Omar
| align="right" | 173
| align="right" | 1.67
|-  bgcolor="#EEEEEE"
! align="left" | Total valid votes
! align="right" | 10,368
! align="right" | 100.00
|}

References

External links
Former City Councillor Peter Li Preti
Candidate Li Preti accepted 46 illegal corporate donations: audit

Canadian people of Italian descent
Independent candidates in the 1993 Canadian federal election
Toronto city councillors
Living people
1950s births